The 1963 Buffalo Bills season was the team’s fourth season in the American Football League. Winless after their first four games, Buffalo won seven of the final ten games, including the final two over the New York Jets, to finish with their second-consecutive 7–6–1 record, tied with the Boston Patriots atop the Eastern division. In this era, this required a tiebreaker playoff, the AFL's first. The Patriots and Bills had split their season series, each team winning at home, and the Bills were slight favorites as playoff hosts.

The playoff game on December 28 was played on a snowy field at War Memorial Stadium and Boston won 26–8, ending Buffalo's season.

Personnel

Staff

Season summary 
The Bills were favored by many to win the AFL's Eastern division before the season, but for the second consecutive season, the Bills had a terrible start to the year, winless in their first four games, with an 0–3–1 record. The Bills rallied to win five of their next six games before going 2–2 in the final four weeks.

Quarterback Jack Kemp was the opening day starter for the first time after an abbreviated 1962 season. By Week Four, however, he was splitting time with rookie Daryle Lamonica. During the middle of the Bills' season (other than two Lamonica starts in Weeks 13 and 14), Kemp established himself as the team's leader and full-time passer. Kemp was conservative, but effective, with only 5.2% of his passes being intercepted.

Wide receivers Elbert Dubenion (53 catches for 959 yards) and Bill Miller (69 for 860) were Kemp's biggest targets in 1963, with Cookie Gilchrist leading the team with 979 rushing yards, third in the league. Gilchrist's 12 rushing touchdowns led the AFL, as did his 256 total touches. Gilchrist set a then-record for yards in a game, with 243 in a blowout win against the Jets in Week Fourteen.

Halfback Wray Carlton was sidelined for most of the season with an injury, forcing Gilchrist to shoulder most of the load.

Going into the final week of the season, the Bills were 6–5–1, whereas the division-leading Patriots were 7–5–1: a Patriots win or a Bills loss would eliminate them. Instead, the Patriots were blown out 35–3 at defending champion Kansas City, and the Bills rallied in the fourth quarter to defeat the Jets in the final sporting event played at the Polo Grounds. The Bills and Patriots, now both 7–6–1, had to play a tiebreaker playoff to determine who would face the Western Division champion Chargers (11–3) in the AFL championship game.

On a freezing day and snowy field in Buffalo, the Bills trailed 16–0 at halftime. Buffalo's only score was a 93-yard pass from Daryle Lamonica to Elbert Dubenion in the third quarter, with a successful two-point conversion to cut the lead in half. The Patriots tacked on another ten unanswered points to win 26–8, and advanced to the AFL championship game against the San Diego Chargers (11–3) of the Western division, who had the week off. (Boston was demolished by San Diego, 51–10).

Offseason

AFL draft

Season schedule 

Note: Intra-division opponents are in bold text.

Standings

Postseason

Final roster

Awards and Records

References 

 Buffalo Bills on jt-sw.com

Buffalo Bills
Buffalo Bills seasons
1963 in sports in New York (state)